Larceny & Old Lace is the third studio album by American punk rock band The Coathangers. It was released on Suicide Squeeze Records on June 7, 2011.

Track listing

Personnel
Julia Kugel (Crook Kid Coathanger) – Guitar, vocals
Stephanie Luke (Rusty Coathanger) – Drums, vocals
Meredith Franco (Minnie Coathanger) – Bass guitar, vocals
Candice Jones (Bebe Coathanger) – Keyboards, vocals
Ed Rawls – Recording, mixing, mastering
Justin McNeight – Recording, mixing, mastering

References

Suicide Squeeze Records albums
The Coathangers albums
2011 albums